I Was Prey also known as  Human Prey is a 2009 single-season series that aired on Animal Planet. The series features episodes where human beings end up as easy prey for animals, carnivorous or herbivorous.

Episodes

Killers on the Loose
Gary Brown's visit to an African chimp sanctuary becomes a deadly struggle when he and his guide are attacked by the colony's escaped alpha male; Idaho Zoo's 'Feast for the Beast' fundraiser takes a bloody turn when a 600-pound Siberian tiger breaks free and pursues one of the organisers, and then takes a turn for the worse when a police officer accidentally shoots the organiser in the hip while attempting to scare the tiger off; and, a police officer stares down an angry bull when the animal escapes from a 'bloodless' Massachusetts bullfight and goes on a rampage.
 Chimpanzee (Pan troglodytes)
 Siberian tiger (Panthera tigris)
 Bull (Bos taurus)

Killers of the Savannah
A conservationist faces an aggressive lion. Camping without a tent during his kayak holiday on the Zambezi River, a pilot is attacked by a hungry hyena as he sleeps. A rogue lioness hunts down a game warden.

 Lion (Panthera leo)
 Hyena (Crocuta crocuta)

Killer Bears
While hiking through Montana's Glacier National Park, Johan Otter and Jenna Otter are attacked by a raging grizzly intent on protecting her cubs; after visiting the hot springs in a remote British Columbia nature park, Patti McConnell and Kelly McConnell are mauled by a hungry 400-pound black bear; and, while on a two-week game shoot in the Alaskan wilderness, the tables turn on Pastor Johnny McCoy and his friend Gary Corle when they are ambushed by a grizzly.
 Grizzly bear (Ursus arctos)
 Black bear (Ursus americanus)

River Killers
While on the job at an exclusive Tampa, Florida golf club, an experienced golf ball diver is attacked by a territorial, 400-pound alligator; Jeff Tanswell's snorkeling trip turns into a bloody battle for his life when he is dragged under by a  saltwater crocodile; and, while leading a Zambezi River safari, an experienced guide is savagely attacked by an aggressive hippopotamus defending its turf.
 Alligator (Alligator mississippiensis)
 Saltwater crocodile (Crocodylus porosus)
 Hippopotamus (Hippopotamus amphibius)

Killer Cats and Dogs
On a camping trip in the Canadian wilderness, the Delventhal family is unwittingly stalked by a hungry and opportunistic wolf; while mowing the lawn on a Sunday afternoon, a suburban Virginia man named Jimmy Hawthorne is repeatedly menaced and attacked by a rabid coyote, and a mountain bike excursion in a California wilderness park becomes a life-and-death struggle when a cyclist is pounced upon and attacked by a 110-pound male cougar.
 Wolf (Canis lupus)
 Coyote (Canis latrans)
 Cougar (Puma concolor)

Killer Sharks
While diving for shellfish off Cape Howe, an Australian man ends up inside the jaws of a Great White shark; training for a triathlon off the Alabama coast, a swimmer meets an aggressive bull shark on the prowl for an early breakfast; and, determined to maintain his championship spear fishing title, Rodney Fox inadvertently becomes bait for a  great white shark.
 Great white shark (Carcharodon carcharias)
 Bull shark (Carcharhinus leucas)

References

Further reading

External links
 

2009 American television series debuts
Year of television series ending missing
2000s American documentary television series
Animal Planet original programming